The 2002 European Tour was the 31st season of golf tournaments since the European Tour officially began in 1972.

The season was made up of 44 tournaments counting towards the Order of Merit, which included the four major championships and three World Golf Championships, and several non-counting "Approved Special Events" including the Ryder Cup which had been postponed from 2001.

The Order of Merit was won by Retief Goosen, defending the title he won in 2001.

Changes for 2002
There were three new tournaments to the European Tour in 2002, the BMW Asian Open in Taiwan, the Omega Hong Kong Open and the ANZ Championship in Australia. The schedule also saw the return of the Open de Canarias, but this was ultimately combined with the Open de España, and the loss of the Greg Norman Holden International, the Moroccan Open, the São Paulo Brazil Open and the Argentine Open.

Schedule
The following table lists official events during the 2002 season.

Unofficial events
The following events were sanctioned by the European Tour, but did not carry official money, nor were wins official.

Order of Merit
The Order of Merit was based on prize money won during the season, calculated in Euros.

Awards

See also
2002 PGA Tour
List of golfers with most European Tour wins

Notes

References

External links
2002 season results on the PGA European Tour website
2002 Order of Merit on the PGA European Tour website

European Tour seasons
European Tour